Naked Eye Magazine was a Canadian entertainment and lifestyle publication distributed by Brand U Media on a quarterly, and then biannual basis. The magazine was published between 1999 and 2010 with interruptions.

Overview
Naked Eye magazine's publicly stated primary mandate was to "celebrate Canadian culture by covering national talent with a global perspective". The magazine focused on both Canadian and international celebrities and trends.

The magazine originally launched in Montreal, Quebec, under XMMA promoter and publisher (and then editor) Burton Rice in 1999 but folded in under a year. It was relaunched as a quarterly in Fall 2007 then was published biannually for its last two issues in 2010.

The target reader group of the magazine was people aged between 18 and 35.

Previously featured celebrities
Naked Eye had a policy of only featuring Canadians on its cover.

Originally cover subjects were limited to actors and musicians, though towards the last issues this expanded to subjects including an ultimate fighter and a latex fetish model.

Fall 2007: Ryan Reynolds 
Winter 2008: Pamela Anderson 
Spring 2008: Feist 
Summer 2008: The Kids in the Hall 
Fall 2008:  Emmanuelle Chriqui 
Winter 2009:  Rachelle Lefevre 
Spring 2009:  Bianca Beauchamp  
Summer 2009:  Georges St-Pierre 
Fall 2009:  Nelly Furtado  
Issue #10: Lights (musician) 
Issue #11:  Malin Åkerman

References

1999 establishments in Quebec
Biannual magazines published in Canada
Entertainment magazines published in Canada
Celebrity magazines
Defunct magazines published in Canada
Magazines established in 1999
Magazines disestablished in 2010
Magazines published in Montreal
Quarterly magazines published in Canada